Serdarušić is a Croatian surname. Notable people with the surname include:

Ante Serdarušić (born 1983), Bosnian Croat footballer
Josip Serdarušić (born 1986), Croatian footballer
Nino Serdarušić (born 1996), Croatian tennis player
Zvonimir Serdarušić (born 1950), Croatian German handball coach and former player competed for Yugoslavia

Croatian surnames
Slavic-language surnames
Patronymic surnames